Dragon silk is a material created by Kraig Biocraft Laboratories of Ann Arbor, Michigan from genetically modified silkworms to create body armor. Dragon silk combines the elasticity and strength of spider silk. It has the tensile strength as high as 1.79 gigapascals (as much as 37%) and the elasticity above 38% exceeding the maximum reported features of the spider silk. It is reported that dragon silk is more flexible than the Monster silk and stronger than the "Big Red, recombinant spider silk designed for increased strength.

Properties

Mechanical properties 
 
Dragon silk has properties higher than that of any other fiber ever noticed.

Tensile Strength

In comparison, Dragon silk's tensile strength is higher than that of steel(450-2000 MPa's). In a report it is said that the strength of Dragon silk is as high as 1.79 GPa's which is 37% higher than the widely reported spider silk. Its tensile strength is higher than the "Big Red silk," which had been reported as the strongest fiber ever made.  "Bid Red Silk" was developed in the same Laboratories as Dragon Silk.

Flexibility

Dragon silk is far more flexible than Kevlar(the material used by US Army to develop body armor). Its flexibility is 38% higher than normal Spider silk and is noticeably more flexible than the "Monster silk" from the same lab. In percentage, Kevlar's flexibility is 3% and Dragon silk's flexibility is 30% to 40%.

History

In 2010, the scientists discovered the first spider silk, which was a great achievement, as it is one of the strongest natural fiber. But the problem was that spiders are cannibalistic and territorial, so it is impossible to create a cost-effective spider farm. To overcome this problem, scientists at Kraig Labs developed a method for making spider silk from silkworms. In 2011, Malcolm J. Fraser, Donald L. Jarvis and their colleagues published a study in which they describe how they remove silkworm silk making protein and replaced it with the spiders protein to built unique forms of silkworms, which they call "super silkworms", that can spin composite spider silk.

References

Silk
Genetic engineering in the United States
Biotechnology